The Quebec Liberal Party (QLP; , PLQ) is a provincial political party in Quebec. It has been independent of the federal Liberal Party of Canada since 1955. The QLP has always been associated with the colour red; each of their main opponents in different eras have been generally associated with the colour blue.

The QLP has traditionally supported a form of Quebec federalist ideology with nuanced Canadian nationalist tones that supports Quebec remaining within the Canadian federation, while also supporting reforms that would allow substantial autonomism in Quebec. In the context of federal Canadian politics, it is a more centrist party when compared to Conservative and Liberal parties in other provinces, such as the British Columbia Liberal Party.

History

Pre-Confederation 
The Liberal Party is descended from the Parti canadien, or Parti Patriote who supported the 1837 Lower Canada Rebellion, and the Parti rouge, who fought for responsible government and against the authority of the Roman Catholic Church in Lower Canada.
The most notable figure of this period was Louis-Joseph Papineau.

Post-Confederation 
The Liberals were in opposition to the ruling Conservatives for most of the first 20 years after Canadian Confederation, except for 18 months of Liberal minority government in 1878–1879.  However, the situation changed in 1885 when the federal Conservative government refused to commute the death sentence of Louis Riel, the leader of the French-speaking Métis people of western Canada.  This decision was unpopular in Quebec. Honoré Mercier rode this wave of discontent to power in 1887, but was brought down by a scandal in 1891. He was later cleared of all charges.  The Conservatives returned to power until 1897.

The Liberals won the 1897 election, and held power without interruption for the next 39 years; the Conservatives never held power in Québec again.  This mirrored the situation in Ottawa, where the arrival of Wilfrid Laurier in the 1896 federal election marked the beginning of Liberal Party of Canada dominance at the federal level.  Notable long-serving Premiers of Quebec in this era were Lomer Gouin and Louis-Alexandre Taschereau.

By 1935, the Conservatives had an ambitious new leader, Maurice Duplessis. Duplessis merged his party with dissident ex-Liberals who had formed the Action libérale nationale.  Duplessis led the new party, the Union Nationale (UN), to power in the 1936 election.  The Liberals returned to power in the 1939 election, but lost it again in the 1944 election. They remained in opposition to the Union Nationale until one year after Duplessis's death in 1959.

In 1955, the PLQ severed its affiliation with the Liberal Party of Canada.

1960–1995 
Under Jean Lesage, the party won a historic election victory in 1960, ending sixteen years of rule by the national-conservative Union Nationale. This marked the beginning of the Quiet Revolution, which dramatically changed Québec society. During this time a social-democratic faction within the party was especially prominent. Under the slogans C'est l'temps qu'ça change (it's time for change) in 1960 and maîtres chez nous (masters in our own house) in 1962, the Quebec government undertook several major initiatives, including:
 Full nationalization of the electricity industry through merger of 11 private companies with the government-owned Hydro-Québec — this major initiative of the government was led by the minister of natural resources, René Lévesque, in 1963.
 Creation of a public pension plan, the Régie des rentes du Québec (QPP/RRQ), separate from the Canada Pension Plan that exists in all other provinces of Canada, and creation of Caisse de dépôt et placement du Québec (CDPQ).
 Elimination of tuition fees for public elementary & secondary schools and creation of the Ministère de l'éducation du Québec.
 Secularisation of schools and hospitals.
 Creation of the Société générale de financement (SGF).
 Creation of the first incarnation of the Office québécois de la langue française (OQLF, originally OLF).
 Mandatory call for bids for all public works contracts above $25,000 (René Lévesque, 1960).
 Creation of Obligations d'épargne du Québec (Québec savings bonds) in 1963.
 Right to strike in public service (1964).
 Creation of an office in Paris, introduction of the Gérin-Lajoie doctrine (meaning that Québec has rights to its own international presence matching its domestic range of jurisdiction).

Under Lesage, the Liberals developed a Quebec nationalist wing. In July 1964, the Quebec Liberal Federation led by Lesage formally disaffiliated from the federal Liberal Party of Canada, making the Quebec Liberal Party a distinct organization from its federal counterpart.

In October 1967, former cabinet minister René Lévesque proposed that the party endorse his plan for sovereignty-association. The proposal was rejected and, as a result, some Liberals, including Lévesque, left the Liberals to join the sovereignty movement, participating in the founding of the Parti Québécois (PQ) under Lévesque's leadership.

Relations soured between the Quebec Liberal Party and the federal Liberal Party under Lesage, and worsened further under Robert Bourassa, who had a poor relationship with Canadian Prime Minister Pierre Trudeau.

First elected in 1970, Robert Bourassa instituted Bill 22 to introduce French as the official language in Quebec, and pushed Trudeau for constitutional concessions. Reelected in 1973, his government was also embarrassed by several scandals. Bourassa resigned from the party's leadership after the loss of the 1976 election to René Lévesque's Parti Québécois.

Bourassa was succeeded as Liberal leader by Claude Ryan, the former director of the respected Montréal newspaper, Le Devoir. Ryan led the successful federalist campaign in the 1980 Quebec referendum on Québec sovereignty, but then lost the 1981 election.  He resigned as Liberal leader some time later, paving the way for the return of Robert Bourassa.

When Bourassa returned as Premier in 1985, he persuaded the federal Progressive Conservative government of Brian Mulroney to recognize Quebec as a distinct society, and sought greater powers for Quebec and the other provinces. This resulted in the Meech Lake Accord and Charlottetown Accord. Both of these proposals, however, were not ratified. While a Quebec nationalist, Bourassa remained an opponent of independence for Quebec.

Daniel Johnson Jr. succeeded Bourassa as Liberal leader and Premier of Québec in 1994, but soon lost the 1994 election to the Parti Québécois under Jacques Parizeau.

In 1993, after the failure of the Charlottetown Accord, many nationalist members of the Liberal party led by Jean Allaire and Mario Dumont, including many from the party's youth wing, left to form the Action démocratique du Québec (ADQ) because the Liberal Party dropped most of its autonomist demands during the negotiation of the Charlottetown Accord. As in 1980, the PLQ campaigned successfully for a "no" vote in the 1995 Quebec referendum on sovereignty.

1998–present 
Around the time of the 1998 Quebec general election the party was referred to as being on the centre-right of the political spectrum.

The Liberals regained power in the 2003 election. Premier Jean Charest was a federal cabinet minister with the now-defunct Progressive Conservative Party including a stint as Deputy Prime Minister and even serving as its leader for a time. The QLP government proposed a policy of reform of social programs and cuts to government spending and the civil service, and established a controversial health system fee for all taxpayers.

It has also softened language policies. In response to a Supreme Court of Canada decision overruling a loophole-closing stopgap measure enacted by the Bernard Landry government, the Liberals enacted Loi 104 which provides for English-language, unsubsidized private school students to transfer into the subsidized English-language system, thus receiving the right to attend English schools in Québec for their siblings and all descendants, should the student demonstrate a bureaucratically-defined parcours authentique within the English system. Meanwhile, the Office québécois de la langue française (Quebec Board of the French Language) under the Liberal provincial government has also opted for a demand-side strategy for the enforcement of language laws, using a number of publicity campaigns, including stickers which merchants may voluntarily affix on their shop windows stating that French service may be obtained within, allowing for consumers to "choose" stores which will serve them in French.

The Liberal party suffered a major setback in the 2007 election, which saw them reduced to a minority government, having lost francophone support to the surging ADQ. However, the party regained a majority in the 2008 election, which saw the collapse of ADQ support and the return of the Parti Québécois as the main opposition party. Election turnout was the lowest in Québec since the Quiet Revolution.

Since its most recent election, the Liberal government has faced a number of scandals, including historic losses at the Caisse de dépôt et placement du Québec, the attribution of highly sought-after subsidized daycare spaces to Liberal Party donors, as well as allegations of systemic construction industry corruption which arose notably during the 2009 Montréal municipal election. After public pressure, the Liberal government eventually called for a public commission of inquiry. Jean Charest's personal approval ratings have at times been lower than those of other premiers.

In 2012, the Liberal government announced it was going to raise university tuition from $2,168 to $3,793 in increments between 2012 and 2017.  This move proved controversial, leading to a significant portion of Quebec post-secondary students striking against the measures. In response to the discord the Quebec Liberal government introduced controversial emergency legislation via Bill 78 that restricted student protest activities, attacking students' right to strike and to demonstrate peacefully, and dealt with the administrative issues resulting from so many students missing classes.

After almost a decade in power, the Liberal government of Jean Charest was defeated in the 2012 provincial election by the Parti Québécois led by Pauline Marois. Charest was also personally defeated in his constituency and resigned as party leader.

They came back into power during the 2014 election under Philippe Couillard. In the 2018 election, they became the official opposition.

The contemporary Quebec Liberal Party is a broad-based federalist and multiculturalist coalition including among its members some supporters of the federal Liberals, New Democratic Party, Bloc Québécois, Greens, and Conservatives. In terms of voter support, it has always been able to rely on the great majority of non-Francophone people in Quebec, in other words, the great majority of Anglophones and Allophones.

Opposition 
The Quebec Liberal Party has faced various opposing parties in its history. Its main opposition from the time of the Confederation (1867) to the 1930s was the Parti conservateur du Québec. That party's successor, the Union Nationale, was the main opposition to the Liberals until the 1970s. Since then the Liberals have alternated in power with the Parti Québécois, a Quebec sovereigntist, self-described social-democratic party and very recently with the Coalition Avenir Québec, a Quebec autonomist and conservative party.

Party leaders 

 Henri-Gustave Joly de Lotbinière (1867–1883) (premier 1878–1879)
 Honoré Mercier (1883–1892) (premier 1887–1891)
 Félix-Gabriel Marchand (1892–1900) (premier 1897–1900)
 Simon-Napoléon Parent (1900–1905) (premier 1900–1905)
 Lomer Gouin (1905–1920) (premier 1905–1920)
 Louis-Alexandre Taschereau (1920–1936) (premier 1920–1936)
 Adélard Godbout (1936–1949) (premier 1936, 1939–1944)
 George Carlyle Marler (interim) (1949–1950)
 Georges-Émile Lapalme (1950–1958)
 Jean Lesage (31 May 1958 – 17 January 1970) (premier 1960–1966)
 Robert Bourassa (17 January 1970 – 1976) (premier 1970–1976)
 Gérard D. Levesque (interim) (1976–1978)
 Claude Ryan (1978–1982)
 Gérard D. Levesque (interim) (1982–1983)
 Robert Bourassa (1983–1994) (premier 1985–1994)
 Daniel Johnson Jr. (1994–1998) (premier 1994)
 Monique Gagnon-Tremblay (interim) (1998)
 Jean Charest (1998–2012) (premier 2003–2012)
 Jean-Marc Fournier (interim) (2012–2013)
 Philippe Couillard (2013–2018) (premier 2014–2018)
 Pierre Arcand (interim) (2018–2020)
 Dominique Anglade (2020–2022)
 Marc Tanguay (interim) (2022–present)

General election results

See also 

 Liberalism in Canada
 List of Quebec general elections
 List of Quebec premiers
 List of Quebec leaders of the Opposition
 Quebec Liberal Party leadership elections

References

External links 
 Parti libéral du Québec official website 
 National Assembly historical information 
 Liberal Party Election Performances 
 EQUITAS Rule of Law Commission - Québec File, an independent supervising body providing forensic analysis of QLP form of governance

 
1867 establishments in Quebec
Liberal parties in Canada
Liberal Party of Canada
Organizations based in Montreal
Organizations based in Quebec City
Political parties established in 1867
Provincial political parties in Quebec